The 2013 Cal State Fullerton Titans baseball team represents California State University, Fullerton in the 2013 NCAA Division I baseball season.  The Titans play their home games at Goodwin Field and are members of the Big West Conference.  The team is coached by Rick Vanderhook in his 2nd season at Cal State Fullerton.

Roster

Schedule

! style="background:#FF7F00;color:#004A80;"| Regular Season
|- valign="top" 

|- align="center" bgcolor="#ccffcc"
| February 15 ||  || Goodwin Field || 3-2 || 3,508 || 1-0 || –
|- align="center" bgcolor="#ccffcc"
| February 16 ||  || Goodwin Field || 10-5 ||  || 2-0 || –
|- align="center" bgcolor="#ccffcc"
| February 16 || Nebraska || Goodwin Field || 9-0 || 2,560 || 3-0 || –
|- align="center" bgcolor="#ccffcc"
| February 17 || @  || Hardt Field || 8–2 || 1,358 || 4–0 || –
|- align="center" bgcolor="#ccffcc"
| February 20 || @  || Eddy D. Field Stadium || 6–3 || 277 || 5–0 || –
|- align="center" bgcolor="#ccffcc"
| February 22 || @  || Lupton Stadium || 7–2 || 4,294 || 6–0 || –
|- align="center" bgcolor="#ccffcc"
| February 23 || @ TCU || Lupton Stadium || 6–2 || 3,906 || 7–0 || –
|- align="center" bgcolor="#ccffcc"
| February 24 || @ TCU || Lupton Stadium || 7–0 || 3,727 || 8–0 || –
|-

|- align="center" bgcolor="#ccffcc"
| March 1 ||  || Goodwin Field || 8–2 || 2,898 || 9–0 || –
|- align="center" bgcolor="#ccffcc"
| March 2 || Oregon || Goodwin Field || 5–2 ||  || 10–0 || –
|- align="center" bgcolor="#ffbbb"
| March 3 || Oregon || Goodwin Field || 1–9 || 2,574 || 10–1 || –
|- align="center" bgcolor="#ffbbb"
| March 5 || @  || Fowler Park || 3–7 || 724 || 10–2 || –
|- align="center" bgcolor="#ccffcc"
| March 6 || @  || Dedeaux Field || 11–4 || 269 || 11–2 || –
|- align="center" bgcolor="#ffbbb"
| March 8 ||  || Goodwin Field || 1–6 || 1,475 || 11–3 || –
|- align="center" bgcolor="#ccffcc"
| March 9 || Texas A&M || Goodwin Field || 2–0 || 2,004 || 12–3 || –
|- align="center" bgcolor="#ccffcc"
| March 10 || Texas A&M || Goodwin Field || 7–6 || 2,143 || 13–3 || –
|- align="center" bgcolor="#ccffcc"
| March 15 || @  || J. L. Johnson Stadium || 5–0 || 2,143 || 14–3 || –
|- align="center" bgcolor="#ccffcc"
| March 16 || @ Oral Roberts || J. L. Johnson Stadium || 6–2 || 567 || 15–3 || –
|- align="center" bgcolor="#ccffcc"
| March 17 || @ Oral Roberts || J. L. Johnson Stadium || 7–4 || 494 || 16–3 || –
|- align="center" bgcolor="#ccffcc"
| March 19 ||  || Goodwin Field || 8–7 (11) || 1,531 || 17–3 || –
|- align="center" bgcolor="#ccffcc"
| March 20 || Nebraska || Goodwin Field || 10–4 || 1,421 || 18–3 || –
|- align="center" bgcolor="#ccffcc"
| March 22 || @  || Blair Field || 6–0 || 1,623 || 19–3 || –
|- align="center" bgcolor="#ccffcc"
| March 23 || @ Long Beach State || Blair Field || 8–6 || 1,591 || 20–3 || –
|- align="center" bgcolor="#ccffcc"
| March 24 || @ Long Beach State || Blair Field || 2–1 || 1,747 || 21–3 || –
|- align="center" bgcolor="#ffbbb"
| March 26 ||  || Goodwin Field || 2–3 || 1,443 || 21–4 || –
|- align="center" bgcolor="#ccffcc"
| March 28 ||  || Goodwin Field || 9–2 || 1,394 || 22–4 || 1–0
|- align="center" bgcolor="#ccffcc"
| March 29 || Pacific || Goodwin Field || 11–6 || 1,824 || 23–4 || 2–0
|- align="center" bgcolor="#ccffcc"
| March 30 || Pacific || Goodwin Field || 25–0 || 1,629 || 24–4 || 3–0
|-

|- align="center" bgcolor="#ccffcc"
| April 2 || @ UCLA || Jackie Robinson Stadium || 9–6 || 723 || 25–4 || –
|- align="center" bgcolor="#ccffcc"
| April 5 || @  || The Pavilion || 3–0 || 527 || 26–4 || 4–0
|- align="center" bgcolor="#ccffcc"
| April 6 || @ UC Davis || The Pavilion || 4–2 || 701 || 27–4 || 5–0
|- align="center" bgcolor="#ccffcc"
| April 7 || @ UC Davis || The Pavilion || 5–2 || 811 || 28–4 || 6–0
|- align="center" bgcolor="#ccffcc"
| April 9 ||  || Goodwin Field || 6–4 || 2,472 || 29–4 || –
|- align="center" bgcolor="#ccffcc"
| April 12 ||  || Goodwin Field || 4–3 || | 1,882 || 30–4 || 7–0
|- align="center" bgcolor="#ccffcc"
| April 13 || UC Santa Barbara || Goodwin Field || 10–2 || 2,749 || 31–4 || 8–0
|- align="center" bgcolor="#ffbbb"
| April 14 || UC Santa Barbara || Goodwin Field || 0–2 || 2,381 || 31–5 || 8–1
|- align="center" bgcolor="#ccffcc"
| April 16 || @  || Eddy D. Field Stadium || 8–4 || 279 || 32–5 || –
|- align="center" bgcolor="#ffbbb"
| April 19 || @  || Robin Baggett Stadium || 1–2 || 2,158 || 32–6 || 8–2
|- align="center" bgcolor="#ccffcc"
| April 20 || @ Cal Poly || Robin Baggett Stadium || 10–5 || 2,352 || 33–6 || 9–2
|- align="center" bgcolor="#ccffcc"
| April 21 || @ Cal Poly || Robin Baggett Stadium || 6–4 || 1,973 || 34–6 || 10–2
|- align="center" bgcolor="#ffbbb"
| April 26 || @  || Les Murakami Stadium || 3–4 || 3,285 || 34–7 || 10–3
|- align="center" bgcolor="#ccffcc"
| April 27 || @ Hawaii || Les Murakami Stadium || 5–0 || 4,224 || 35–7 || 11–3
|- align="center" bgcolor="#ccffcc"
| April 28 || @ Hawaii || Les Murakami Stadium || 3–0 || 3,185 || 36–7 || 12–3
|-

|- align="center" bgcolor="#ccffcc"
| May 3 ||  || Goodwin Field || 3–2 || 3,136 || 37–7 || 13–3
|- align="center" bgcolor="#ccffcc"
| May 4 || Long Beach State || Goodwin Field || 2–1 || 2,278 || 38–7 || 14–3
|- align="center" bgcolor="#ccffcc"
| May 5 || Long Beach State || Goodwin Field || 9–4 || 2,143 || 39–7 || 15–3
|- align="center" bgcolor="#ccffcc"
| May 10 || @  || Riverside Sports Complex || 14–7 || 529 || 40–7 || 16–3
|- align="center" bgcolor="#ccffcc"
| May 11 || @ UC Riverside || Riverside Sports Complex || 12–0 || 728 || 41–7 || 17–3
|- align="center" bgcolor="#ffbbb"
| May 12 || @ UC Riverside || Riverside Sports Complex || 6–7 || 334 || 41–8 || 17–4
|- align="center" bgcolor="#ccffcc"
| May 14 || UCLA || Goodwin Field || 5–2 || 2,738 || 42–8 || –
|- align="center" bgcolor="#ccffcc"
| May 17 ||  || Goodwin Field || 5–2 || 2,083 || 43–8 || 18–4
|- align="center" bgcolor="#ccffcc"
| May 18 || UC Irvine || Goodwin Field || 3–2 || 2,399 || 44–8 || 19–4
|- align="center" bgcolor="#ccffcc"
| May 19 || UC Irvine || Goodwin Field || 7–5 || 2,551 || 45–8 || 20–4
|- align="center" bgcolor="#ccffcc"
| May 23 || @  || Matador Field || 5–2 || 594 || 46–8 || 21–4
|- align="center" bgcolor="#ccffcc"
| May 24 || @ Cal State Northridge || Matador Field || 6–4 || 618 || 47–8 || 22–4
|- align="center" bgcolor="#ccffcc"
| May 25 || @ Cal State Northridge || Matador Field || 9–6 || 716 || 48–8 || 23–4
|-

|- 
! style="background:#004A80;color:#FF7F00;"| Post-Season
|- 

|- align="center" bgcolor="#ccffcc"
| May 31 || (4) Columbia || Goodwin Field • Fullerton, CA || 4–1 || Wiest (9–3) || Speer (6–3) || None || 3,183 || 49–8 || 1–0
|- align="center"
| May 31 || (2)  || Goodwin Field • Fullerton, CA ||  ||  ||  ||  ||  || || 
|-

Ranking movements

References

Cal State Fullerton Titans baseball seasons
Cal State Fullerton
Big West Conference baseball champion seasons
2013 NCAA Division I baseball tournament participants
Fullerton Titans